Das Mädchen und der Staatsanwalt ("The Girl and the Prosecutor") is a 1962 German drama film directed by Jürgen Goslar and starring Wolfgang Preiss, Götz George and Elke Sommer.

Cast 
 Wolfgang Preiss as Staatsanwalt Soldan
 Elke Sommer as Renate Hecker
 Götz George as Jochen Rehbert
 Berta Drews as Frau Hecker
 Agnes Fink as Frau Soldan
 Fritz Tillmann as Doctor Stoll
 Paul Dahlke as Vorsitzender
 Ann Smyrner as Monika Pinkus
 Horst Janson as Thomas Ungermann

References

External links 
 

1962 films
1962 drama films
German drama films
West German films
1960s German-language films
1960s legal films
1960s German films